Greenhills may refer to:
Greenhills, North Ayrshire, a village in Ayrshire
Greenhills, Dublin, a suburb of the city of Dublin, Ireland
Greenhills, Ohio, a village in the county of Hamilton, Ohio, United States
Greenhills Beach, a southern suburb of Sydney
Greenhills School, a school in the city of Ann Arbor, Michigan, United States 
Greenhills Adventure Park, an attraction in Victor Harbor, South Australia
Greenhills, East Kilbride, a district within the town of East Kilbride, Scotland
Wack Wack-Greenhills East, Mandaluyong, a barangay of Mandaluyong, Metro Manila, the Philippines
La Salle Green Hills, in barangay Wack Wack-Greenhills East
Greenhills, San Juan, a barangay of San Juan, Metro Manila, Philippines
Greenhills Shopping Center, in barangay Greenhills
Greenhills, Western Australia, in the Shire of York, Australia
Stockland Greenhills, shopping centre in East Maitland, Australia

See also
Green Hills (disambiguation)
Greenhill (disambiguation)
Green Hill (disambiguation)